Hamdy Awad El-Safi (born 14 April 1972) is a former Egyptian male volleyball player. He was included in the Egypt men's national volleyball team that finished 11th at the 2000 Summer Olympics in Sydney, Australia.

Clubs 

 Al Ahly SC  :

-  14 × Egyptian Volleyball League : 1989–90, 1993–94, 1994–95, 1995–96, 1998–99, 1999–2000, 2001/02, 2002/03, 2003/04, 2005/06, 2006/07, 2008/09, 2009/10, 2010/11.

-  12 × Egyptian Volleyball Cup : 1989/90, 1995/96, 1998/99, 2001/02, 2002/03, 2003/04, 2004/05, 2005/06, 2006/07, 2007/08, 2009/10, 2010/11.

-  7 × African Clubs Championship (volleyball) : 1995 - 1996 - 1997 - 2003 - 2004 - 2006 - 2010.

-  6 × African Club Championship Cup Winners : 1991 - 1992 - 1995 - 1996 - 1997 - 2000
 1 : 2001

-  5 × Arab Clubs Championship (volleyball) : 2001 - 2002 - 2005 - 2006 - 2010.

  El Mokawloon SC  

 1 × African Club Championship Cup Winners : 1993 (loan)

 Al-Hilal  : 
 1 × AVC Club Volleyball Championship : 1998 (loan)

  CS Sfaxien VB 
 1 × Arab Clubs Championship (volleyball) : 2008 (loan)

National team

  3 × Men's African Volleyball Championship : 2005 - 2007 - 2009
  3 × Men's African Volleyball Championship : 1995 - 1999 - 2003
  1 × Volleyball at the 2005 Mediterranean Games : 2005
  2 × African Games : 2003 - 2007
 5th place at 2005 FIVB Volleyball Men's World Grand Champions Cup
  1 × Arab Games : 2006

See also
 Egypt at the 2000 Summer Olympics

References

External links
 profile at sports-reference.com
FIVB profile

1972 births
Living people
Egyptian men's volleyball players
Egyptian volleyball coaches
Place of birth missing (living people)
Volleyball players at the 2000 Summer Olympics
Olympic volleyball players of Egypt
Mediterranean Games medalists in volleyball
Mediterranean Games gold medalists for Egypt
Competitors at the 2005 Mediterranean Games
African Games gold medalists for Egypt
African Games medalists in volleyball
Competitors at the 2003 All-Africa Games
Competitors at the 2007 All-Africa Games
Sportspeople from Cairo
Volleyball players at the 2008 Summer Olympics
21st-century Egyptian people